Os Nossos Dias (English: Our Days) is a Portuguese telenovela broadcast on RTP1.

Cast
Pedro Laginha 
Anabela Teixeira
Débora Monteiro
Carla Maciel
Orlando Costa
Sara Norte
Luís Lucas
Luís Gaspar
Ana Guiomar
Luís Mascarenhas
Sandra Faleiro
Joaquim Nicolau
Inês Faria
Marta Fernandes
Helder Agapito
Luís Vicente
Duarte Gomes
Sisley Dias

Synopsis
A popular soap opera (or telenovela) in Portugal running from 2013 to present, Os Nossos Dias follows the daily lives of its many characters. Among the typical soap opera-esque romances featured in the show, significant social-awareness issues have also been featured, i.e., domestic violence, living with HIV, and homophobia. Despite the thoughtful, progressive, and socially responsible scripts and production of Os Nossos Dias, in 2015, RTP (the national television station airing the show), garnered widespread international criticism for censoring two scenes showing two of the major male characters, portrayed by Duarte Gomes and Sisley Dias, kissing as part of a major 'coming out' gay storyline.

References

External links
 

2013 Portuguese television series debuts
2016 Portuguese television series endings
2013 telenovelas
Portuguese telenovelas
Rádio e Televisão de Portugal telenovelas
Portuguese-language telenovelas